Ikongo (formlery Fort Canot ) is a district of Fitovinany in Madagascar.

Communes
The district is further divided into 17 communes:

 Ambatofotsy
 Ambinanitromby
 Ambohimisafy
 Ambolomadinika
 Andefapony
 Ankarimbelo
 Antodinga
 Belemoka
 Ifanirea
 Ikongo (Fort Canot)
 Kalafotsy
 Manampatrana
 Maromiandra
 Sahalanona
 Tanakambana
 Tolongoina
 Tsifenokataka

References 

Districts of Fitovinany